Variarterivirinae is a subfamily of enveloped, positive-strand RNA viruses which infect vertebrates. The subfamily is in the family Arteriviridae and order Nidovirales. The subfamily contains three genera.

Structure 
Member viruses are enveloped, spherical, and 45–60 nm in diameter.

Genome 
Variarteriviruses have a positive-sense single-stranded RNA genome.

Taxonomy 
The subfamily Variarterivirinae contains three genera:

Betaarterivirus
Gammaarterivirus
Nuarterivirus

References 

Nidovirales
Arteriviridae
Virus subfamilies